The 1990 2. divisjon was a Norwegian second-tier football league season. This was the last season the second tier was named 2. divisjon. From the 1991 season and onwards, the name of the second level of the Norwegian football league system has been 1. divisjon.

The league was contested by 24 teams, divided into two groups; A and B. The winners of group A and B were promoted to the 1991 Tippeligaen. The second placed teams met the 10th position finisher in the Tippeligaen in a qualification round where the winner was promoted to Tippeligaen. The bottom three teams inn both groups were relegated to the new 2. divisjon.

Overview

Summary
Sogndal won group A with 48 points and Lyn won group B with 45 points. Both teams promoted to the 1991 Tippeligaen. The second-placed teams, Bryne and Eik met Lillestrøm in the promotion play-offs. Lillestrøm won the qualification and remained in the Tippeligaen.

Tables

Group A

Group B

Promotion play-offs

Results
 Bryne – Eik 5–1
 Eik – Lillestrøm 1–3
 Lillestrøm – Bryne 2–0

Lillestrøm won the qualification round and remained in the Tippeligaen.

Play-off table

References

Norwegian First Division seasons
1990 in Norwegian football
Norway
Norway